Andrea Molnár (born 3 March 1975) is a Hungarian gymnast. She competed at the 1992 Summer Olympics and the 1996 Summer Olympics.

References

1975 births
Living people
Hungarian female artistic gymnasts
Olympic gymnasts of Hungary
Gymnasts at the 1992 Summer Olympics
Gymnasts at the 1996 Summer Olympics
Gymnasts from Budapest